Shchetinskoye is a rural locality (a selo) in Myaksinskoye Rural Settlement, Cherepovetsky District, Vologda Oblast, Russia. The population was 246 as of 2002. There are 3 streets.

Geography 
Shchetinskoye is located 45 km southeast of Cherepovets (the district's administrative centre) by road. Novinka is the nearest rural locality.

References 

Rural localities in Cherepovetsky District